The 2017–18 Rwanda Premier League, known as the Azam Rwanda Premier League for sponsorship reasons, was the 41st season of top-tier football in Rwanda. The season started on 30 September 2017 and concluded on 27 June 2018.

Standings
Final table.

References

Rwanda National Football League seasons
Premier League
Premier League
Rwanda